The 1983 Kansas City Royals season  was their 15th in Major League Baseball. The Royals finished second in the American League West at 79-83, 20 games behind the Chicago White Sox. Dan Quisenberry's league-leading 45 saves also set a single-season franchise record.

Offseason 
 December 8, 1982: Tim Ireland was released by the Royals.
 February 5, 1983: Cecil Fielder was traded by the Royals to the Toronto Blue Jays for Leon Roberts.

Regular season 
 April 20, 1983: George Brett had 7 RBI in one game versus the Detroit Tigers.

Season standings

Record vs. opponents

Notable transactions 
 April 1, 1983: Bombo Rivera was released by the Royals.
 July 6, 1983: Gaylord Perry was signed as a free agent by the Royals.
 July 22, 1983: Mélido Pérez was signed as an amateur free agent by the Royals.
 August 2, 1983: Eric Rasmussen was purchased by the Royals from the St. Louis Cardinals.
 August 5, 1983: Vida Blue was released by the Royals.

Pine Tar Game 

The Pine Tar Game refers to a controversial incident that took place in an American League baseball game played between the Kansas City Royals and New York Yankees on July 24, 1983.

Playing at New York's Yankee Stadium, the Royals were trailing 4-3 with two outs in the top of the ninth and U L Washington on first base.  In the on deck circle, George Brett  was heard remarking to a teammate, "Watch this baby fly" as he shook his bat.  He then came to the plate and connected off Yankee reliever Rich "Goose" Gossage for a two-run home run and a 5-4 lead. As Brett crossed the plate, New York manager Billy Martin approached home plate umpire Tim McClelland and requested that Brett's bat be examined. Earlier in the season, Martin and other members (most notably, third baseman Graig Nettles, who as a member of the Minnesota Twins, recalled a similar incident involving Thurman Munson) of the Yankees had noticed the amount of pine tar used by Brett, but Martin had chosen not to say anything until the home run.

With Brett watching from the dugout, McClelland and the rest of the umpiring crew inspected the bat.

Roster

Player stats

Batting

Starters by position 
Note: Pos = Position; G = Games played; AB = At bats; H = Hits; Avg. = Batting average; HR = Home runs; RBI = Runs batted in

Other batters 
Note: G = Games played; AB = At bats; H = Hits; Avg. = Batting average; HR = Home runs; RBI = Runs batted in

Pitching

Starting pitchers 
Note: G = Games pitched; IP = Innings pitched; W = Wins; L = Losses; ERA = Earned run average; SO = Strikeouts

Other pitchers 
Note: G = Games pitched; IP = Innings pitched; W = Wins; L = Losses; ERA = Earned run average; SO = Strikeouts

Relief pitchers 
Note: G = Games pitched; W = Wins; L = Losses; SV = Saves; ERA = Earned run average; SO = Strikeouts

Farm system

Notes

References

External links 
1983 Kansas City Royals at Baseball Reference
1983 Kansas City Royals at Baseball Almanac

Kansas City Royals seasons
1983 Major League Baseball season
Kansas City